Pujilí is a small town in the Cotopaxi Province of Ecuador, located ten to twenty minutes from Latacunga. It is the seat of the Pujilí Canton. Pujilí houses mainly indigenous Ecuadorians, and does not see a lot of tourists.  It is well known for the market the town hosts on Sundays and Wednesdays.  Among the many things sold there are their clothes, which people travel miles to buy, and has become a very profitable local endeavor.  Pujilí is also known for its pottery and ceramics.  It does not see as much tourist activity as towns such as Otavalo, so it remains a pretty pure indigenous market. However, more and more it is being discovered by tourists thirsting for something more authentic. Pujilí is also home to churches, artisan shops, and a yellow and blue staircase from which you can see the entire town.

Pujilí is the birthplace of General Guillermo Rodríguez Lara (born November 4, 1924), a career army officer who was president of Ecuador from 1972 to 1976. After being removed from power in 1976, Lara retired to his farm outside Pujilí, where he lived out his days.

References 

 www.inec.gov.ec
 www.ame.gov.ec

Populated places in Cotopaxi Province